Brian Joseph White (born April 21, 1975) is an American actor. He is best known for his roles in films such as The Family Stone (2005), The Game Plan (2007), 12 Rounds (2009), I Can Do Bad All by Myself (2009), Good Deeds (2012), and The Cabin in the Woods (2012). On television, White had prominent roles in Men of a Certain Age (2009–11), Beauty and the Beast (2012-13), and Ambitions (2019).

Early life
White was born in Boston, Massachusetts, the son of Estela Bowser, a financial advisor, and Jo Jo White, a Hall of Fame basketball player for the Boston Celtics, sports executive, and restaurateur. He is the oldest of six children. White graduated from Newton South High School and Dartmouth College, where he was a member of the Beta Theta Pi fraternity.

Career
White began acting in a number of television series such as Moesha, The Parkers, Spyder Games, Second Time Around, and The Shield. He then moved into film roles, appearing in The Family Stone, Brick, Stomp the Yard, The Game Plan, and In the Name of the King: A Dungeon Siege Tale. He had a recurring role as Lieutenant Carl Davis on Moonlight. In 2009, White appeared in the films Fighting and 12 Rounds. He starred in I Can Do Bad All by Myself, and followed this with a regular role in the series Men of a Certain Age.

In 2011, White starred in The Heart Specialist and Politics of Love. He then began touring with the David E. Talbert stage play What My Husband Doesn't Know. The tour ran from May 8 to December 18. White became the co-host of the UNCF national "Empower Me" tour and starred in the music video for Monica's song "Until it's Gone". In 2012, he appeared in Good Deeds and The Cabin in the Woods. In 2015, he appeared in the television series Scandal as the love interest of Olivia Pope. In 2014, he starred in the music video from Global singer Agnez Mo titled "Coke Bottle" and "As Long As I Get Paid". He had a recurring role  as Captain Dallas Patterson in season 4 of NBC's Chicago Fire.

In 2018, White began starring in the two Urban Movie Channel drama series, Bronx SIU and Monogamy. In 2019 and 2020, he received Daytime Emmy Award nomination for Outstanding Lead Actor in a Digital Daytime Drama Series for Bronx SIU. In 2019, he starred opposite Robin Givens in the Oprah Winfrey Network prime time soap opera, Ambitions.

Personal life
White and Paula Da Silva married in 2010. They have a daughter who was born in 2014.

Filmography

Film

Television

Awards and nominations

Stage

References

External links

Brian J. White's official website
 
One on One - Brian White (video) - Interview with Brian White on Al-Jazeera English

1975 births
Living people
American male film actors
Dartmouth College alumni
Male actors from Boston
20th-century American male actors
21st-century American male actors
African-American male actors
American male television actors
Newton South High School alumni
20th-century African-American people
21st-century African-American people